The masked corydoras, bandit catfish, bandit corydoras, or Meta River corydoras (Corydoras metae) is a tropical freshwater fish belonging to the Corydoradinae sub-family of the family Callichthyidae.  It originates in inland waters of South America, and is found in the Meta River basin in Colombia. A maximum length of 4.8 cm has been recorded.

See also
 List of freshwater aquarium fish species

References

External links
 Photos from Fishbase

Corydoras
Freshwater fish of Colombia
Fishkeeping
Fish described in 1914